The 1976 Longling earthquake in Yunnan Province, People's Republic of China, was a doublet earthquake, with two main shocks striking just east of Longling at 12:23:20 and 14:00:22 UTC (20:23 and 22:00 local time).  The magnitudes were estimated at 6.7 and 6.6, respectively, on the  scale, and 6.9 and 7.0 on the  scale; Chinese sources put these at 7.4 and 7.3 on the  scale. The region is noted for the quantity and intensity of its earthquakes, and the complexity of its tectonics, which are closely related to the collision between the Indian and Eurasian tectonic plates.

No one died in the Longling county town Loss in the 9 counties in Baoshan, Lincang and Dehong were 98 deaths, 451 severe injuries and 1991 light injuries. 420,000 buildings collapsed in an area of 1883 square kilometers.

Geology 
Yunnan is a mountainous region lying east of Tibet, and north of the Red River Fault that strikes southeast along the Red River into North Vietnam and the South China Sea. The Red River fault is deep – some believe it may reach the lithosphere – and forms a major tectonic boundary that separates Indochina from the South China block.

The seismotectonics of Yunnan and the adjacent areas is driven by the collision of the Indian Plate with the Eurasian Plate. This has uplifted the Tibetan Plateau (and the Himalaya Mountains) and forced it eastwards, pushing the South China Block and Indochina towards the westward subducting Philippine Sea Plate and creating various extensional structures. All of this has created a complicated geological structure with many faults, which in western Yunnan has allowed heat and fluids from the subducting Indian Plate to rise into the upper crust, creating the Tengchong volcanic field to the north of Longling and the Longling fault (location of the first event), and west of the Nu River and Nu River fault (location of the second event). It appears that igneous intrusions have weakened the bedrock in this area, which has led to uneven accumulations of stress, which caused the earthquake.

See also
1976 Tangshan earthquake (July 28)
1976 Songpan–Pingwu earthquake (August 16–23)
List of earthquakes in 1976
List of earthquakes in Yunnan
List of earthquakes in China
1988 Lancang–Gengma earthquakes

Notes

Sources

 
 
 

 .

 .

 .

 .

  (in Chinese with English abstract).

 .

External links

1976 Longling
1976 in China
1976 earthquakes
Geography of Baoshan, Yunnan
Earthquakes in Myanmar
1976 disasters in China